Sinnar is a takula (tehsil) in Niphad subdivision of Nashik District in Maharashtra, India.

Notes

Talukas in Maharashtra